Love Your Abuser is the debut studio album by American band Lymbyc Systym, released in 2007 on Mush Records.

Track listing

References

2007 debut albums
Lymbyc Systym albums
Mush Records albums